{{Infobox weapon
|is_missile      = yes
|name            = Miniature Hit-to-Kill Missile
|image           = 
|image_size      = 
|caption         = 
|origin          = United States of America
|type            = Short-range, Active radar homing, Passive radar homing surface-to-air missile
|used_by         = 
|manufacturer    = Lockheed Martin
|unit_cost       = $16,000 
|propellant      =
|production_date =
|service         = 
|variants        = Active and Passive radar guidance versions
|engine          = Solid-fuel rocket motor
|weight          = 
|length          = 
|height          = 
|diameter        = 
|wingspan        = 
|speed           = 
|vehicle_range   = 
|ceiling         =
|altitude        =
|filling         = 
|guidance        = Active or Passive radar guidance
|detonation      = 
|launch_platform = 
Surface-launched:''’
Multi-Mission Launcher
}}
The Miniature Hit-to-Kill Missile (MHTK)''' is a small air defense missile developed by Lockheed Martin for the short range air defense (SHORAD) and Counter Rocket, Artillery, and Mortar (C-RAM). Like the Israeli  Tamir and  Stunner the MHTK uses hit-to-kill for the terminal phase of interception.

Origins
The MHTK was first tested by the US Army in April 2016 as part of an engineering demonstration for the Indirect Fire Protection Capability Increment 2-Intercept program.

Development
Development began in 2012. In 2018 the US Army awarded Lockheed Martin 2.6 million USD to begin formal development of the missile as part of the Extended Mission Area Missile (EMAM) program.

Variants
Both active and semi-active radar homing versions have been developed, as of 2018 they share a common configuration.

See also
 Multi-Mission Launcher
 List of missiles
 ADATS
 Lightweight Multirole Missile

References

21st-century surface-to-air missiles
Lockheed Martin
Missile defense
Surface-to-air missiles of the United States